Vaudry is a former commune in the Calvados department in the Normandy region in northwestern France. On 1 January 2016, it was merged into the new commune of Vire Normandie.

Population

See also
Communes of the Calvados department

References

External links

Vaudry on perso.wanadoo.fr

Former communes of Calvados (department)
Calvados communes articles needing translation from French Wikipedia